Eddie Pullen (August 16, 1883 — October 6, 1940) was an American racing driver who worked for and primarily raced the Mercer marque.

Biography
He was born on August 16, 1883 in Trenton, New Jersey.

Pullen began his racing career in 1912 and won his first Championship Car race on the road course at the Tacoma Speedway in Tacoma, Washington. He won the 1914 American Grand Prize at Santa Monica, but failed to qualify for the Indianapolis 500 as the Mercer he drove was better suited to road course racing than the open expanses of the Indianapolis Motor Speedway. He was retroactively awarded 2nd place in the 1914 National Championship. Pullen raced for West Coast Mercer dealer George R. Bentel in 1915 along with Barney Oldfield and Eddie Rickenbacker. 

He continued driving a Mercer even after the manufacturer had ceased supporting its racing program. He switched to a Hudson in 1919 but struggled. In 1921 for his final season of racing he switched to a Duesenberg and won a 20 lap race on the Beverly Hills board oval. Later that year he surrendered his 1921 Indianapolis 500 entry to Joe Thomas but drove in relief for Jimmy Murphy on raceday but crashed on lap 107.

In July 1932, Pullen worked on a Ford Motor Company promotion demonstrating the endurance of the newly developed V-8 engine, with a   demonstration, in the Mojave desert, near Rosamond, California.

He died on October 6, 1940.

References

External links

Eddie Pullen at ChampCarStats.com

1883 births
1940 deaths
Grand Prix drivers
Indianapolis 500 drivers
Sportspeople from Trenton, New Jersey
Racing drivers from New Jersey
AAA Championship Car drivers